Wayne Lo (born November 14, 1974) is an American citizen born in Taiwan who perpetrated the shooting at Bard College at Simon's Rock on December 14, 1992, in Great Barrington, Massachusetts. He murdered one student and a professor, and wounded four people, before he surrendered to police. He is currently serving two life sentences without the possibility of parole plus 20 years.

Background 
Lo was born in Tainan, Taiwan, to Chia Wei Lo, a fighter pilot, and Lin Lin Lo, a violin teacher, both Mainland Chinese immigrants to Taiwan. The Lo family moved to the United States in spring 1981, living in a suburban neighborhood in Rockville, Maryland, while Chia Wei Lo was assigned to a diplomatic post in Washington, D.C. While living in Maryland, the 7-year-old Lo became a violinist with the Montgomery County Youth Orchestra.

His family returned to Taiwan in 1983, after Chia-Wei relinquished his position that year. The family later settled in northwest Billings, Montana, in summer 1987. His parents later managed the Great Wall Chinese restaurant at Grand Avenue in Billings. He attended Lewis & Clark Junior High School in Billings for seventh to eighth grade, before attending Billings Central Catholic High School for his freshman and sophomore year. Lo was a violinist in the Billings Symphony Orchestra beginning at age fourteen. He attended the Aspen Music Festival in 1990 and studied under the prominent violin teacher Dorothy DeLay. Lo had a GPA of 3.56 in his sophomore year.

In April 1991, Lo was accepted by Simon's Rock College of Bard in Great Barrington, Massachusetts, and given the W.E.B. Du Bois minority scholarship, beginning fall classes that September. He had wanted to attend a boarding school to estrange himself from his father. While attending Simon's Rock, Lo expressed racist and fascist beliefs. He wrote an essay arguing for segregation of homosexuals to prevent the spread of AIDS, and denied the existence of the Holocaust. Other students reported being uncomfortable with his expression of these beliefs.

The shooting
On the morning of December 14, 1992, Simon's Rock receptionist Teresa Beavers searched a package addressed to Lo from the North Carolina company Classic Arms, and found 7.62 caliber ammunition inside the package. She notified college residence directors, and called for an investigation of Lo's dormitory. Residence director Katherine Robinson went to Lo's dormitory and asked Lo if she could see the contents of the package. Lo refused and Robinson informed the associate dean of students. Robinson returned to Lo's dormitory with her husband and searched his room, but found no weapons or ammunition. Lo told them the ammunition was a Christmas gift for his father; Lo was sent to the dean's office, and later the dean dismissed him, suspecting he was not possessing any weapons on the school campus. Reports were inconsistent, as other students had made complaints about Lo stockpiling ammunition in his dormitory. Chris Lucht, associate dean, had allegedly refused to investigate.

That night, an anonymous person phoned school officials, claiming that Lo was armed with weapons and was going to kill members of the Robinson family. The caller identified himself as another student with whom Lo had dinner that night. The Robinsons contacted the college provost, Ba Win, and went with their children to stay at Win's home in Lee, Massachusetts. There they called the dean to locate Lo; no precaution was taken, however, and the police were never notified.

Lo was hiding the ammunition which he had ordered two days earlier. On December 14, at around 10:00 a.m. Lo travelled by taxi to Pittsfield, Massachusetts, and purchased a SKS semi-automatic rifle at Dave's Sporting Goods store. The shooting began at approximately 10:20 p.m. in the school security area. He shot Theresa Beavers twice in the abdomen, and later fatally shot a Spanish language teacher Ñacuñán Sáez while he was driving his Ford Festiva. Lo then fatally shot student Galen Gibson who had left the library to assist whoever had crashed their car, unaware that there was a gunman on campus. Lo also wounded another student. Afterward, Lo walked towards a dormitory where he wounded two freshmen students. Lo's rifle jammed and he dropped his weapon before he walked to the student union building and phoned police to tell them of his actions. Lo surrendered to police without further incident.

Those killed in the shooting were student Galen Gibson, 18, and professor Ñacuñán Sáez, 37. Gibson was a poetry major from Gloucester, Massachusetts, while Sáez was an Argentine-born Spanish professor. Those wounded were the security guard Theresa Beavers, 42, and students Thomas McElderry, 19, Joshua A. Faber, 17, and Matthew Lee David, 18.

In the February 22, 2013, PBS Need to Know show titled "After Newtown" (see Newtown Mass Murder) the journalist Maria Hinojosa reported, "In fact, in an interview with Newsweek in 2007 after 32 people were killed in the Virginia Tech shootings ... Wayne Lo said: 'The fact that I was able to buy a rifle in 15 minutes, that's absurd. I was 18. I couldn't have rented a car to drive home from school, yet I could purchase a rifle. Obviously a waiting period would be great. Personally, I only had five days left of school before winter break ... If I had a two-week waiting period for the gun, I wouldn't have done it.'"

Trial, conviction & incarceration 
Lo's month-long trial took place at the Berkshire County House of Corrections in Pittsfield. Although claims were made by the media prior to the trial regarding Lo's supposed racist beliefs, he was never charged with a hate crime, and the racism accusations were never substantiated. Instead, the focus turned to his mental state at the time of the shooting as Lo made an insanity plea. His psychiatrists testified that he was suffering from paranoid schizophrenia, while a court-appointed psychiatrist attributed Lo's actions merely to narcissistic personality disorder.

On February 3, 1994, Lo was found guilty on all 17 charges against him and sentenced to two consecutive life sentences without possibility of parole.

Lo spent nine months at a maximum security facility at Walpole, Massachusetts, from February to November 1994. He was later transferred to MCI-Norfolk, a medium security prison in Norfolk, Massachusetts.

Aftermath
In 1999, Gregory Gibson, the father of victim Galen Gibson, wrote Gone Boy: A Walkabout, a detailed book recounting the shooting. The book spurred correspondence between Gibson and Lo, which was detailed in a New York Times article, as well as a German TV documentary film. In December 2017, Lo was interviewed by Gibson.  In the video, Lo explains how easy it is to legally obtain a semi-automatic rifle in the United States.

Lo wore a sweatshirt with the name of the New York City hardcore punk band Sick of It All during the shooting. This spurred the band to issue press releases denouncing Lo's crimes. The journalist Chuck Klosterman wrote a passage in his book, Killing Yourself to Live, in which Wayne Lo writes Klosterman a letter from prison contemplating what questions might have been raised if Lo were arrested wearing a T-shirt with the bands Poison or Warrant instead of Sick of It All.

Jonathan Fast’s detailing of the shooting in Ceremonial Violence: A Psychological Explanation of School Shootings led to Gibson publishing an article regarding allegations of plagiarized passages taken directly from Gone Boy: A Walkabout.

Through an intermediary, Lo sold art he made in prison, donating proceeds to The Galen Gibson Fund.

Lo was an inspiration for the 2019 feature film Cuck by director Rob Lambert. Rob rode the school bus with Wayne while they both lived in Billings, MT.

References

External links

Gone Boy official site
SkidLo.net Wayne Lo's official website
Amok official site 
Interview with Lo about the VT massacre
RLI Insurance Company vs. Simon's Rock Early College and others, Massachusetts Superior Court opinion Insurance litigation judgment includes details of the incident's circumstances (via FindLaw)
Wayne Lo  at Hyaena Gallery.com
Flushy.us
Need to Know's "Echoes of a Shooting"
"Meeting the man who killed my son"

1974 births
Living people
1992 mass shootings in the United States
American people convicted of murder
American people of Chinese descent
American people of Taiwanese descent
American prisoners sentenced to life imprisonment
Aspen Music Festival and School alumni
People convicted of murder by Massachusetts
People from Billings, Montana
People from Rockville, Maryland
People from Tainan
People with narcissistic personality disorder
Prisoners sentenced to life imprisonment by Massachusetts
Mass shootings in the United States
American Holocaust deniers
American people convicted of attempted murder